La Banque postale is a French postal bank, created on 1 January 2006 as a subsidiary of La Poste, the national postal service.

Overview 
The bank provides service to over 10.8 million active private customers, as well as more than 400,000 customers businesses, professionals, social economy actors and local public sector bodies. The company is considered to be one of the leading lenders to local authorities, maintaining an expansive branch network in France consisting of over 17,000 contact points and 7,700 post offices. It is the only bank in France charged with the responsibility to implement banking services to the public under a legislative initiative to modernize the French economy in 2008. La Banque postale reports a net income of €5.602 billion, -2.5% relative to 2015.

History 

In 1882 the French state established the Caisse Nationale d'Épargne (CNE) to manage retail savings collected through the French network of post offices. The CNE thus competed for the collection of small retail savings with the local Caisses d'Épargne (also known in that context as ) which were private-sector entities.

In 2012, the company set out to be a benchmark partner for the public sector, focusing on working with all regional stakeholders. By 2015, La Banque postale's commitments had been realized, now being recognized as the reference bank for local authorities concerning financing and banking services, as well for stakeholders dealing with social housing, local institutions, public health-care establishments and semi-public corporations.

Controversy 

In 2010 the French government's Autorité de la concurrence (the department in charge of regulating competition) fined eleven banks, including La Banque postale, the sum of €384.9 million for colluding to charge unjustified fees on check processing, especially for extra fees charged during the transition from paper check transfer to "Exchanges Check-Image" electronic transfer.

Climate policy 
In October 2021, the bank announced that it would no longer provide financial services to oil and gas companies, invest in companies active in the sector and finance any related projects. It additionally presented a plan to completely exit the oil and gas industries by 2030, becoming the first bank to make such a pledge. The policy has been described as an "historic precedent" in the banking sector by environmental organisations such as Reclaim Finance, Friends of the Earth France and Oxfam France.

References

External links 

 

Banks based in Paris
Banks under direct supervision of the European Central Bank
Postal savings system
Banks of France